Premakkoo Permitte is a 1967 Indian Kannada-language film, directed by R. Nagendra Rao and produced by Harini. The film stars Kalyan Kumar, Kalpana, Narasimharaju and Jr. Revathi.

Cast

Kalyan Kumar as Diwakar
Kalpana as Viji
Narasimharaju as Ramesh, Viji's brother
Jr. Revathi
Arun Kumar
Kumari Lalitha
R. Nagendra Rao as Viji and Ramesh's father
Dinesh
H. R. Shastry
P. Vadiraj as Gajapathi
B. Ramadevi
B. Kamalamma
Indrani
U. Mahabala Rao
Srinivas
Guruswamy
Udupi Jayaram
G. M. Nanjappa
Venkataramaiah

Soundtrack
The music was composed by Vijaya Bhaskar.

References

External links
 

1967 films
1960s Kannada-language films
Films scored by Vijaya Bhaskar